Jonathan Fabián Zacaría (born 6 February 1990) is an Argentine footballer who plays for club Aldosivi.

Career
In October 2020, Zacaría joined Aldosivi. He scored his first goal for his new team on December 6, 2021 against Argentinos Juniors.

Honours
Universidad de Chile
 Primera División (1): 2017–C

References

External links
 
 

1990 births
Living people
Argentine footballers
Argentine expatriate footballers
Quilmes Atlético Club footballers
Club Almirante Brown footballers
Club Atlético Platense footballers
Club Deportivo Palestino footballers
Universidad de Chile footballers
Chilean Primera División players
Expatriate footballers in Chile
Association football defenders
Association football midfielders
People from Ramos Mejía
Sportspeople from Buenos Aires Province
Argentine people of Italian descent